China competed at the 2006 Winter Olympics in Turin, Italy. Yang Yang (A), a short track speed skater, served as flag bearer at the Opening Ceremonies. Like most previous Olympics, coverage was via CCTV-5. The team excluded athletes from the Special Administrative Region of Hong Kong, which competed separately as Hong Kong, China.

Medalists

Alpine skiing 

Note: In the men's combined, run 1 is the downhill, and runs 2 and 3 are the slalom. In the women's combined, run 1 and 2 are the slalom, and run 3 the downhill.

Biathlon

Cross-country skiing 

Zhang Chengye competed in both the biathlon and cross-country skiing for China.

Distance

Men

Women

Sprint

Men

Women

Figure skating 

The pairs event in figure skating captured sports headlines in China on Valentine's Day. Although the Russian pair captured the gold medal, the Chinese performances that earned the silver and bronze received significant praise from the media. China's Zhang Dan and Zhang Hao finished an almost flawless free skate after falling some 40 seconds into the program with a failed quadruple throw attempt. Many media outlets characterized the performance as the pinnacle of Chinese hard work and discipline. Sohu's official headline was "Pairs skaters capture silver, inspires world". Meanwhile, veteran Zhao Hongbo, who was nursing an ankle injury, and his partner Shen Xue finished on the podium after a slightly disappointing performance in the short program.

Key: CD = Compulsory Dance, FD = Free Dance, FS = Free Skate, OD = Original Dance, SP = Short Program

Freestyle skiing

Short track speed skating 

Key: 'ADV' indicates a skater was advanced due to being interfered with.

Ski jumping 

Note: PQ indicates a skier was pre-qualified for the final, based on entry rankings.

Snowboarding 

Halfpipe

Note: In the final, the single best score from two runs is used to determine the ranking. A bracketed score indicates a run that wasn't counted.

Speed skating 

Men

Women

Team pursuit

References

 
 Yahoo China's Turin Olympics Page (Chinese)

Nations at the 2006 Winter Olympics
2006
Winter Olympics